Aunese Curreen (born Setefano Mika, 23 December 1981) is a Samoan middle distance runner, who specialized in the 800 metres. He is currently a member of the North Harbour Bays Athletics Club in Auckland, New Zealand.

Curreen represented Samoa at the 2008 Summer Olympics in Beijing, where he competed for the men's 800 metres. He ran in the fifth heat against six other athletes, including Sudan's Ismail Ahmed Ismail, who eventually won the silver medal in the final. He finished the race in sixth place by three hundredths of a second (0.03) behind South Africa's Samson Ngoepe, with a national record and personal best time of 1:47.45. Curreen, however, failed to advance into the semi-finals, as he placed twenty-ninth overall, and was ranked farther below two mandatory slots for the next round.

Achievements

References

External links
 
NBC Olympics Profile

Samoan male middle-distance runners
Living people
Olympic athletes of Samoa
Athletes (track and field) at the 2008 Summer Olympics
1981 births